The following lists events that happened in 2015 in Sweden.

Incumbents
Monarch – Carl XVI Gustaf
Prime Minister – Stefan Löfven

Events
10 August: Västerås IKEA stabbing attack
18 March: 2015 Gothenburg pub shooting
23 May: Måns Zelmerlöw's song Heroes wins the Eurovision Song Contest in Vienna, Austria.
22 October: Trollhättan school attack
12 November: Shopping mall Mall of Scandinavia is inaugurated in Solna.
 The Sweden Democrats announced that they would break ties with its youth league Sweden Democratic Youth for its Radical Ultranationalism.

Deaths
 11 January – Anita Ekberg, actress (b. 1931).
 26 March – Tomas Tranströmer, Nobel poet and translator (b. 1931).
 30 April – Lennart Bodström, politician (b. 1928).
 4 June – Bengt Berndtsson, footballer (b. 1933).
 5 October – Henning Mankell, author (b. 1948).
 21 November – Linda Haglund, 59, short-distance runner (b. 1956).
 19 December – Karin Söder, politician (b. 1928).
 22 December – Peter Lundblad, 65, singer (b. 1950).

See also
 2015 in Swedish television

References

 
Years of the 21st century in Sweden
Sweden
Sweden
2010s in Sweden